The Manville School District is a comprehensive community public school district that serves students in pre-kindergarten through twelfth grade from Manville in Somerset County, New Jersey, United States.

As of the 2019–20 school year, the district, comprised of four schools, had an enrollment of 1,601 students and 132.5 classroom teachers (on an FTE basis), for a student–teacher ratio of 12.1:1.

The district is classified by the New Jersey Department of Education as being in District Factor Group "CD", the sixth-highest of eight groupings. District Factor Groups categorize districts statewide to allow comparison by common socioeconomic characteristics of the local districts. From lowest socioeconomic status to highest, the categories are A, B, CD, DE, FG, GH, I and J.

Schools
Schools in the district (with 2019–20 enrollment data from the National Center for Education Statistics) are:
Elementary schools
Weston Elementary School with 349 students in grades PreK-2
Aldo Russo, Principal
Roosevelt Elementary School with 234 students in grades 3-4
Alica Mathewson, Principal
Middle school
Alexander Batcho Intermediate School with 485 students in grades 5-8
Mike Magliacano, Principal
High school
Manville High School with 450 students in grades 9-12
Adam M. Wright, Principal

Administration
Core members of the school's administration are:
Jamil Maroun, Superintendent
Allison Bogart, Business Administrator / Board Secretary

Board of education
The district's board of education is comprised of nine members who set policy and oversee the fiscal and educational operation of the district through its administration. As a Type II school district, the board's trustees are elected directly by voters to serve three-year terms of office on a staggered basis, with three seats up for election each year held (since 2012) as part of the November general election. The board appoints a superintendent to oversee the day-to-day operation of the district.

References

External links
Manville School District

School Data for the Manville School District, National Center for Education Statistics

Manville, New Jersey
New Jersey District Factor Group CD
School districts in Somerset County, New Jersey